Catherine Sheldrick Ross  (November 4, 1945 – September 11, 2021) was a professor and later dean of the Faculty of Information and Media Studies at University of Western Ontario. In 2018, she was elected a Fellow of the Royal Society of Canada.

Personal life
Ross was born to parents Russell and Elsie Sheldrick in London, Ontario, although she spent her summers in New Brunswick. Both her mother and aunt Murielle were teachers.

Education and career
Ross earned her undergraduate and master's degree at the University of Toronto before completing her PhD at the University of Western Ontario. Due to budget cuts, Ross was unable to find a career in teaching until 1981 when she joined the School of Library and Information Science at the University of Western Ontario.

In 1995, Ross was awarded the Jesse Shera Award for Research by the American Library Association for her article “If They Read Nancy Drew, So What? – Readers Talk Back."

After reading Paulette Bourgeois book series Franklin the Turtle, Ross was inspired to start writing her own children-targeted books. In 1996, her book "Squares: Shapes in Math, Science and Nature" was awarded the Science in Society Book Award by the Canadian Science Writers’ Association. In academia, she was awarded the Reference Service Press Award for her co-authored article in the Reference and User Services Quarterly journal, "Flying a Light Aircraft: Reference Service Evaluation from a User's Viewpoint." That same year, Ross's department merged with the School of Journalism and Part-time and Continuing Education to form the Faculty of Information and Media Studies (FIMS). After the retirement of Manjunath Pendakur in 2000, Ross stepped in as dean of FIMS. In 2002, Ross and Kirsti Nilsen were named the winners of the 2002 Reference Service Press Award for their article "Has the Internet Changed Anything in Reference? The Library Visit Study, Phase 2." In 2007, Ross stepped down as dean and was the recipient of the Award for Professional Contribution to Library and Information Science Education  in 2008. In 2009, Ross was one of the first inductees into the Special Interest Group on Information Needs, Seeking, and Use Academy of the Association for Information Science and Technology. She retired from teaching in 2010.

In 2013, Ross was the recipient of the NoveList's Margaret E. Munroe Award for her “significant contributions to library adult services.” In 2015, her book "Shapes in Math, Science and Nature: Squares, Triangles and Circles" was shortlisted for the Information Book Award by the Children's Literature Roundtables of Canada.

In 2018, Ross was elected a Fellow of the Royal Society of Canada.

Death
Ross died of biliary cancer in London, Ontario, on September 11, 2021.

Publications
The following is a list of publications:
Conducting the reference interview: a how-to-do-it manual for librarians (2019)
Reading still matters: what the research reveals about reading, libraries, and community (2018)
Shapes in math, science and nature: squares, triangles and circles (2014)
The pleasures of reading: a booklover's alphabet (2014)
Communicating professionally: a how-to-do-it manual (2013)
Squares (1996)
Triangles: shapes in math, science and nature (1994)
Circles: shapes in math, science and nature (1992)
Alice Munro: a double life (1992)
The amazing milk book (1991)

References 

1945 births
2021 deaths
Canadian women non-fiction writers
Canadian women academics
Fellows of the Royal Society of Canada
University of Toronto alumni
Academic staff of the University of Western Ontario
Writers from London, Ontario
Deaths from cancer in Ontario
Deaths from cholangiocarcinoma